Let Oceans Lie is the second album by American metalcore band A Hero A Fake, released on January 19, 2010, through Victory Records.  A music video for the album's self-titled single, Let Oceans Lie, was produced by Scott Hansen and premiered on MTV2 on February 13, 2010.

Track listing

Personnel
A Hero A Fake
Justin Brown – Vocals
Eric Morgan - Guitar
Patrick Jeffers – Guitar
Lenin Hernandez – Guitar, Vocals†
Matt Davis – Bass, Vocals
Tim Burgess – Drums, Percussion

† filed for name change to Alex Avigliano

Production
Produced and mixed by Jamie King
Mastered by Jamie King
Additional recording by Justin Brown
Album artwork by Justin Reich
Album layout by Jason Link
Band photography by Justin Reich

References

A Hero A Fake albums
2010 albums
Victory Records albums
Albums produced by Jamie King (record producer)